Danielle Colby (born December 3, 1975) is an American reality television personality who appears on the History reality television show American Pickers.

Personal life
Danielle Colby was born in Davenport, Iowa, and brought up as a Jehovah’s Witness. By 2004, she was married to Englishman Robert Strong with two children. Colby's television career eventually led to the breakup of her marriage. In May 2012, she told WQAD-TV that "fame and notoriety are not easy for him to deal with at all, so the relationship ended up not working out".

Performance career
Colby owned and participated in a female roller derby team, the Big Mouth Mickies, for three years until injuries forced her to give it up.

While living with her family in Chicago, she attended a burlesque performance starring comedian Margaret Cho and  dancer Satan's Angel. This prompted in her a desire to become a burlesque dancer; and, after she moved back with her family to the Quad Cities area of Iowa, she created the professional burlesque troupe Burlesque Le Moustache, with nine performers, including Colby herself under the stage name Dannie Diesel, touring eastern Iowa and western Illinois. As of October 2014, Colby owned a burlesque academy called Dannie Diesel's Bump 'n' Grind Academy in the Rogers Park neighborhood of Chicago.

American Pickers
Colby had been a close friend of Mike Wolfe for a decade before the concept of the show had even been developed. Once the show was sold to the History Channel, Wolfe asked Colby to work at the office of the antique shop Antique Archaeology.

American Pickers premiered on the History Channel on January 18, 2010. As of September 8, 2010, it was the top rated non-fiction series of 2010 among total viewers and adults 25–54.

Fashion design
Colby owned and operated 4 Miles 2 Memphis, a retro clothing based company.  A brick and mortar location opened on January 8, 2013 in the Wicker Park area of Chicago; however, it closed within a year.

References

External links
Danielle Colby American Pickers site
Danielle Colby Cushman Interview

1975 births
Living people
American neo-burlesque performers
American female dancers
Dancers from Iowa
American roller skaters
Participants in American reality television series
People from Davenport, Iowa
Roller derby skaters
American antiques experts
Former Jehovah's Witnesses
21st-century American women